Jinchengjiang railway station is a railway station in Jinchengjiang District, Hechi, Guangxi, China.

On 7 September 2007 a project to rebuild the station was started.

References 

Railway stations in Guangxi